Cyperus dentatus is a species of sedge that is native to parts of North America.

See also 
 List of Cyperus species

References 

dentatus
Taxa named by John Torrey
Plants described in 1823
Flora of Alabama
Flora of Delaware
Flora of Connecticut
Flora of Georgia (U.S. state)
Flora of Indiana
Flora of Maine
Flora of Maryland
Flora of Massachusetts
Flora of New Brunswick
Flora of New Hampshire
Flora of New Jersey
Flora of New York (state)
Flora of North Carolina
Flora of Nova Scotia
Flora of Ontario
Flora of Pennsylvania
Flora of Quebec
Flora of Rhode Island
Flora of South Carolina
Flora of Tennessee
Flora of Virginia
Flora of Vermont
Flora without expected TNC conservation status